Enfield Town Ladies Football Club are a women's association football club, affiliated to Enfield Town F.C. They are members of the .

They play their home games at Enfield Town's Queen Elizabeth II Stadium.

In 2016 they reached the final of the Premier League Plate under the management of Greek Cypriot footballer Kyri Neocleous., their first ever national cup final.

Youth teams
Enfield Town Ladies have a youth section with teams for girls from under-10 to under-16 levels.

References

Enfield, London
Women's football clubs in England
Sport in the London Borough of Enfield
FA Women's National League teams